Gołuchów may refer to:

Gołuchów, Greater Poland Voivodeship, Poland
Gołuchów, Świętokrzyskie Voivodeship, Poland

See also
Gmina Gołuchów